Lopaskyne is a village in Shchastia Raion (district) in Luhansk Oblast of eastern Ukraine, on the left bank of the Donets river.

Demographics
Native language as of the Ukrainian Census of 2001:
Ukrainian 9.42%
Russian 90.58%

References

External links
 Weather forecast for Lopaskine

Villages in Shchastia Raion